Phyllonorycter graecus is a moth of the family Gracillariidae. It is known from the Peloponnisos in Greece.

There are at least two, but possibly multiple generations per year.

The larvae feed on Quercus macrolepis. They mine the leaves of their host plant. They create a large, strongly contracted, lower-surface, tentiform mine. Pupation takes place in de mine in a flimsy cocoon.

References

graecus
Moths of Europe
Moths described in 2007